Gracelino Tavares Barbosa (born 1 February 1985) is a Cape Verdean Paralympic athlete who competes in the T20 category.  Barbosa represented his home country at the 2016 Summer Paralympics, where he won the bronze medal in the 400 meters race, subsequently becoming the first in the country to medal at the Paralympics.

Career
Growing up in Cape Verde, Barbosa originally intended to compete in football but a broken toe encouraged him to transition into track and field. Barbosa represented his home country at the 2016 Summer Paralympics, where he won the bronze medal in the 400 meters T20 subsequently becoming the first in the country to medal at the Paralympics. Following this, Barbosa competed at the IX World Championship, run through the International Sports Federation for Persons with Intellectual Disability, and won the 400 meters hurdles, 100 meters and 110 meters hurdles. As a result of his accomplishments, he received the Second Grade of the Medal of Sport Merit in Cape Verde in 2017. 

In 2018, Barbosa competed at the World Championship of the International Federation of Sports for Athletes with Intellectual Disabilities in France and won three medals. He won a bronze medal in the 200 meters, a gold medal in the 60 meters, and silver in the 60 meters hurdles. Two years later, Barbosa continued to compete in international games and won multiple titles. In March 2020, Barbosa competed at the World Athletics Indoor Tour in Toruń, Poland and placed first in the 60 meters and 60 meters hurdles. He remained in Poland for the World Cup and won a gold medal in the 400 meter hurdles.

References

Living people
1985 births
Paralympic athletes of Cape Verde
Athletes (track and field) at the 2016 Summer Paralympics
Medalists at the 2016 Summer Paralympics
Competitors in athletics with intellectual disability
Intellectual Disability category Paralympic competitors
Cape Verdean male sprinters
Cape Verdean male hurdlers